Queen Kelly is an American silent film produced in 1928–29 and released by United Artists. The film was directed by Erich von Stroheim, starred Gloria Swanson, in the title role, Walter Byron as her lover, and Seena Owen. The film was produced by Joseph P. Kennedy, who was Swanson's lover at the time.

In 1932, Swanson was able to release a part-sound version in Europe and South America only because of her contract with Stroheim. This version had an alternate ending directed by Richard Boleslawski and filmed by cinematographer Gregg Toland.

Plot
Prince Wolfram (Byron) is the betrothed of mad Queen Regina V of Kronberg (Owen). As punishment for partying with other women, he is sent on manoeuvres. He sees Kitty Kelly (Swanson) walking with other convent students and flirts with her. She is embarrassed when he makes a comment after seeing that her underwear is visible, so she takes it off and throws it at him, to the horror of the nuns, who punish her for her "indecency".

Enthralled by her beauty, he kidnaps her that night from the convent, takes her to his room and professes his love for her. When the queen finds them together the next morning, she whips Kelly and throws her out of the castle. Regina then puts Wolfram in prison for not wanting to marry her.

Endings
In the original ending, Kelly goes to German East Africa to visit her dying aunt and is forced to marry a repulsive man named Jan. The aunt dies after the wedding and Kelly refuses to live with him, instead becoming the madam of her aunt's brothel. Her extravagances and style earn her the name "Queen Kelly".

In the alternate ending, Kelly dies in despair after her humiliation at the hands of the queen and a contrite Wolfram visits her body.

Cast
Gloria Swanson - Kitty Kelly, aka Queen Kelly 
Walter Byron - Prince Wolfram 
Seena Owen - Queen Regina V 
Sylvia Ashton - Kelly's Aunt 
Wilson Benge - Prince Wolfram's Valet 
Sidney Bracey - Prince Wolfram's Lackey 
Florence Gibson - Kelly's Aunt 
Madge Hunt - Mother Superior 
Tully Marshall - Jan Vryheid 
Madame Sul-Te-Wan - Kali Sana, Aunt's Cook  
Wilhelm von Brincken - Prince Wolfram's adjutant 
Gordon Westcott - Lackey

Production

The production of the costly film was shut down after complaints by Swanson about the direction the film was taking. Though the European scenes were full of innuendo, and featured a philandering prince and a sex-crazed queen, the scenes set in Africa were grim and, Swanson felt, distasteful. In later interviews, Swanson had claimed that she had been misled by the script which referred to her character arriving in, and taking over, a dance hall; looking at the rushes, it was obvious the 'dance hall' was actually a brothel.

Stroheim was fired from the film, and the African storyline scrapped. Swanson and Kennedy still wanted to salvage the European material because it had been so costly and time-consuming, and had potential market value. An alternate ending was, however, shot on November 24, 1931. In this ending, Kelly dies after her experiences with the prince (it is implied to be suicide). Prince Wolfram is shown visiting the palace. A nun leads him to the chapel, where Kelly's body lies in state. These scenes were directed by Richard Boleslawski, photographed by Gregg Toland, and edited by Viola Lawrence. This has been called the 'Swanson Ending'.

Distribution
 The film was not released theatrically in the United States, but it was shown in Europe and South America with the 'Swanson ending' added. This was due to a clause in Stroheim's contract.

In 1933, von Stroheim submitted a script called Poto Poto to MGM. Though it was never produced, the script contained several elements recycled from the African story of Queen Kelly. A short extract of the film appears in Sunset Boulevard (1950), representing an old silent picture Swanson's character Norma Desmond - herself a silent movie star - had made. Von Stroheim is also a primary character in Sunset Boulevard as her ex-director, ex-husband, and current butler. By some accounts, von Stroheim suggested the clip be used for its heavy irony. This was the first time viewers in the U.S. got to see any footage of the infamous collaboration.

In the 1960s, it was shown on television with the Swanson ending, along with a taped introduction and conclusion in which Swanson talked about the history of the project.

By 1985, Kino International had acquired the rights to the movie and restored two versions: one that uses still photos and subtitles in an attempt to wrap up the storyline, and the other the European "suicide ending" version. Kino remains the rights holder and is responsible for all distribution, including television and home video.

Accolades
The film is recognized by American Film Institute in these lists:
 2002: AFI's 100 Years...100 Passions – Nominated

See also
Sadie Thompson (1928)
The Love of Sunya (1927)

References

External links
 
 
 
 
 Queen Kelly at Silent Era

1929 films
Silent American drama films
American black-and-white films
1929 drama films
Films directed by Edmund Goulding 
Films directed by Erich von Stroheim
Films directed by Sam Wood 
American silent feature films
United Artists films
Films set in Europe
Films about prostitution
Monarchy in fiction
1920s American films
1930s American films